This is a list of men's national basketball team players who represented Serbia and Montenegro (formerly FR Yugoslavia) at the EuroBasket, the FIBA Basketball World Cup, and the Summer Olympics. 

The Serbia and Montenegro squad participated at six EuroBasket tournaments (1996, 1997, 1999, 2001, 2003, 2005), three Basketball World Cups (1998, 2002, 2006), and three Summer Olympics (1996, 2000, 2004). 

In this list are not included players that: 
 played at the qualification tournaments for named competitions, the Mediterranean Games, and other minor tournaments,
 represented SFR Yugoslavia (1947–1991) and Serbia or Montenegro (2007 onwards).

Key

Players 
Note: This list is correct through the end of the 2006 FIBA World Championship.

Footers

See also 
 List of Serbia men's national basketball team players
 List of Yugoslavia men's national basketball team rosters

Notes

References

External links

–
Lists of basketball players in Serbia